Edmund Gustaf Thormählen (21 July 1865 – 13 November 1946) was a Swedish sailor who competed in the 1908 Summer Olympics. He was a crew member of the Swedish boat Vinga, which won the silver medal in the 8 metre class.

References

External links 
 
 
 

1865 births
1946 deaths
Swedish male sailors (sport)
Olympic sailors of Sweden
Olympic silver medalists for Sweden
Olympic medalists in sailing
Sailors at the 1908 Summer Olympics – 8 Metre
Medalists at the 1908 Summer Olympics